The canton of Colmar-2 is an administrative division of the Haut-Rhin department, northeastern France. It was created at the French canton reorganisation which came into effect in March 2015. Its seat is in Colmar.

It consists of the following communes:

Andolsheim
Bischwihr
Colmar (partly)
Fortschwihr
Grussenheim
Horbourg-Wihr
Houssen
Jebsheim
Muntzenheim
Porte-du-Ried
Sainte-Croix-en-Plaine
Sundhoffen
Wickerschwihr

References

Cantons of Haut-Rhin